The seventh and final season of the American television drama series Sons of Anarchy premiered on September 9, 2014, and concluded on December 9, 2014, after 13 episodes aired on cable network FX. Created by Kurt Sutter, it is about the lives of a close-knit outlaw motorcycle club operating in Charming, a fictional town in California's Central Valley. The show centers on protagonist Jackson "Jax" Teller (Charlie Hunnam), the President of the club, who begins questioning the club and himself after reading his father’s journal about how Samcro dies, (his father the original founder of SOA) is murdered.

Sons of Anarchy is the story of the Teller-Morrow family of Charming, California, as well as other members of the Sons of Anarchy Motorcycle Club, Redwood Original (SAMCRO), their families, various Charming townspeople, allied and rival gangs, associates, and law agencies that undermine or support SAMCRO's legal and illegal enterprises.

Plot
Jax struggles with his recent loss and turns himself into the authorities. While in jail, Jax makes decisions that radically alter the direction of the club and uses it to exact revenge for the death of his wife. Another member's death fuels the hate and lies created by Gemma and Juice, who are on the run and hiding from the club. After Jax learns the truth, he works to make things right with all parties involved. The series ends with Jax making the ultimate sacrifice to complete his part of the story of SAMCRO and fulfill his father's vision.

Cast and characters

Sons of Anarchy is the story of the Teller-Morrow family of Charming, California, as well as the other members of Sons of Anarchy Motorcycle Club, Redwood Original (SAMCRO), their families, various Charming townspeople, allied and rival gangs, associates, and law agencies that undermine or support SAMCRO's legal and illegal enterprises.

Main cast
 

 Charlie Hunnam as Jackson "Jax" Teller 
 Katey Sagal as Gemma Teller Morrow 
 Mark Boone Junior as Robert "Bobby Elvis" Munson 
 Dayton Callie as Wayne Unser 
 Kim Coates as Alex "Tig" Trager 
 Drea de Matteo as Wendy Case 
 Tommy Flanagan as Filip "Chibs" Telford 
 David LaBrava as Happy Lowman 
 Niko Nicotera as George "Rat Boy" Skogstorm 
 Theo Rossi as Juan-Carlos "Juice" Ortiz 
 Jimmy Smits as Nero Padilla

Special guest cast
 Annabeth Gish as Althea Jarry 
 Kenneth Choi as Henry Lin 
 Courtney Love as Ms. Harrison 
 Peter Weller as Charles Barosky 
 Walton Goggins as Venus Van Dam 
 CCH Pounder as Tyne Patterson 
 Michael Chiklis as Milo 
 Robert Patrick as Les Packer

Recurring cast
 Rusty Coones as Rane Quinn 
 Hayley McFarland as Brooke Putner 
 Mo McRae as Tyler Yost 
 Michael Ornstein as Chuck Marstein 
 Jacob Vargas as Allesandro Montez 
 Marilyn Manson as Ron Tully 
 Winter Ave Zoli as Lyla Winston 
 Ivo Nandi as Oscar "El Oso" Ramos 
 Emilio Rivera as Marcus Alvarez 
 April Grace as Loutreesha Haddem 
 Arjay Smith as Grant McQueen 
 Michael Beach as T.O. Cross 
 Marya Delver as Officer Candy Eglee 
 Mathew St. Patrick as Moses Cartwright 
 Brad Carter as Leland Gruen 
 Ron Yuan as Ryu Tom 
 Billy Brown as August Marks 
 Michael Shamus Wiles as Jury White 
 Malcolm-Jamal Warner as Sticky 
 Tony Curran as Gaines 
 Douglas Bennet as Orlin West 
 Kim Dickens as Colette Jane 
 Reynaldo Gallegos as Fiasco 
 Bob McCracken as Brendan Roarke
 Alan O'Neill as Hugh

Guest stars 
 Inbar Lavi as Winsome 
 Olivia Burnette as Homeless Woman 
 Jenna Jameson as Porn Director 
 Lea Michele as Gertie 
 Alicia Coppola as Mildred Treal 
 Hal Holbrook as Nate Madock 
 Charisma Carpenter as Carol

Production
Although Sons of Anarchy is set in Northern California's Central Valley, it is filmed primarily at Occidental Studios Stage 5A in North Hollywood. Main sets located there include the clubhouse, St. Thomas Hospital and Jax's house. The production rooms at the studio used by the writing staff also double as the Charming police station. External scenes are often filmed nearby in Sun Valley and Tujunga.

Sons of Anarchy was renewed for a seventh and final season that began airing in September 2014. Ron Perlman and Maggie Siff did not return, due to their characters being killed off at the end of season six. Drea de Matteo, David LaBrava and Niko Nicotera were all promoted to the regular cast. Robert Patrick, Emilio Rivera, and Billy Brown returned in their recurring guest roles, as did CCH Pounder, Peter Weller and Kim Dickens but only for limited appearances. Marilyn Manson guest starred as a drug addict who is a high-ranking member of a neo-Nazi prison sect. Malcolm-Jamal Warner joined the cast for a recurring role. Glee actress Lea Michele also had a guest role as a truck stop waitress and single mother in the sixth episode of the season. Former Buffy the Vampire Slayer/Angel actress Charisma Carpenter also had a guest role as an administrative director at a medical facility.

Episodes

Reception
The last season received generally favorable reviews. At Metacritic, the season received a score of 68% based on reviews from 6 critics. On review aggregator website Rotten Tomatoes, it has an approval rating of 83% based on 186 reviews. The site's critical consensus reads: "The final season of Sons of Anarchy rides toward the series finale on its grounded characters and clearly defined storylines, without losing any of the show's bone-chilling action."

Home media release
The season was released in the United States on DVD and Blu-ray on February 24, 2015.

References

External links
 
 

 
2014 American television seasons